Taprogge GmbH is a medium-sized company based in Wetter, Germany. The company is named after founding brothers Ludwig and Josef Taprogge. Founded in 1953, the company is known for its tube cleaning systems for steam turbine condensers, heat exchangers and debris filters for water-cooled shell and tube heat exchangers and condensers.

Invention of the tube cleaning system 
Josef Taprogge was a turbine engineer in a power plant nearby Essen and was responsible for the cleaning of the turbine condenser tubes. Cleaning had to be performed while the turbine was out of operation, with the power station not being able to supply any electrical energy to the grid during the turbine outage. On the other hand, the careful elimination of fouling from inside of the tubing is important for a high vacuum in the condenser and thereby for the optimal efficiency of the energy generation through water vapour.

To avoid economic losses caused by shutdowns, Josef Taprogge invented a continuously working cleaning system which kept the condenser free from fouling during the operation of the steam turbine. A prototype was installed into the cooling water pipe leading to the condenser. During the time of the German Wirtschaftswunder, the process which was marketed and further developed by Taprogge GmbH was widespread and very well received in the power stations due to its efficiency. The efficiency of the power stations that are equipped with the systems increases by around 2 – 4%. The cleaning process became well known and the name "Taprogge System" has been used in the technical literature.

Tube cleaning systems

The patented process uses sponge rubber balls which are injected into the cooling water flow (1) before it enters into the condenser. The diameter of the cleaning balls is only slightly bigger than the nominal diameter of the condenser tubing. Due to their elasticity they generate a contact pressure on their way through the condenser tubes by which fouling is removed from the inner tube walls. At the condenser outlet a strainer (2) is installed in the connecting pipe which separates the balls from the water flow and feeds them into a DN 80 pipe. From there the balls are pumped back to their starting point by a 4 kW impeller pump via a DN 80 pipe. To inject the balls into the cycle, a pressure vessel with detachable cover is installed downstream of the pump. This so-called collector (3b) is equipped with a screen and a flap. At open flap, the balls can pass and with closed flap they remain in the collector and can be replenished or exchanged. The process works continuously and the tubes remain free of mud, algae, bacteria and scaling. The operation of the system is monitored via sight glasses and electronic measuring instruments. The screen surfaces are arranged on shafts with pivoted bearings and can be turned on demand to have fouling removed by the water flow. In this process the balls are caught in the collector. This time-consuming procedure is automatized (3c), gear motors (M) operate the relevant actuators. The minal diameters of the screens have been adjusted to respond to the developments in power station technology and are produced in sizes from nominal diameter 150 mm to 3600 mm. The cleaning ball diameters range from 14 to 30 mm and filling one collector normally requires several hundred of them. However, some cleaning systems can require well over a thousand cleaning balls. The lifetime of the cleaning balls which are produced of biodegradable natural rubber is around 4 weeks.

A specialized technology is the production of tube cleaning systems for seawater desalination plants. As the heated seawater called brine has a particularly corrosive effect, excellent corrosion resistant yet heat conducting materials (like Titanium) have to be used for such systems. Due to the large tube diameters in the evaporators, the cleaning balls have diameters of up to 45 mm.

Debris filtration systems

In the 1970s, the product range was extended by backwash filters to protect the heat exchangers and condensers from macro fouling, like stones, pieces of wood, fibres, plastic sheeting, and mussels. Foreign matter will first settle on the filter surface. As fouling builds up, differential pressure between filter inlet and outlet increases and the filter has to be cleaned by backwashing. For this purpose an electrically driven rotor covers the filter surface which is connected with a pipe leading outside. Installed in this pipe is a valve that is opened during the backwash process. The accumulated fouling is drawn off and discharged via the pipe which, downstream of the condenser, leads to the main cooling water pipe or a debris container. This technology was spread in power stations and industrial plants the world over. Depending on the flow rates to be filtered, the filters are produced in nominal diameters from 150 mm to DN 3200 mm. The filter surface consists of stainless steel with punched holes. For difficult types of debris, filter surfaces of plastic or grids can be used. A further type produced by the company are fine filters with filtration degrees from 50 to 1000 μm.

Water intake systems

Since the late 1990s, Taprogge offers another filter system which retains fouling already at the intake into the cooling water system – in this way the entire system and the long cooling water pipes can be protected. The system called TAPIS (Taprogge Air Powered Intake System) is installed in the water at the cooling water pipe inlet in the form of a polyhedral housing with plain filter surfaces. It is cleaned by pressurized air blast. In contrast to submarine rakes for seaborne matter, the stainless steel filter has no moving parts and masters biggest water flows. The filter surfaces are made of coated plastic provided with drilled holes.

Literature
 Heat Exchanger Fouling, Fundamental Approaches and Technical Solutions; Editor: Prof.Dr.-Ing. Hans Mueller-Steinhagen .

External links
 Taprogge GmbH (German and English)

Companies based in North Rhine-Westphalia
Fouling
Engineering companies of Germany